A scorecard may refer to:

Balanced scorecard, a tool used by managers to measure employee performance
Credit scorecards, a tool used to assess customers for creditworthiness
Scorecard (baseball), a record of a baseball game's details
Scorecard (cricket), a summary of a cricket match's statistics
Scorecard (golf), a record of a golfer's score